The 24th Intelligence Squadron is an active United States Air Force unit stationed at Ramstein Air Base, Germany.  The squadron was first activated as the 24th Observation Squadron during World War II.  it conducted aerial reconnaissance training, until converting to the photographic mission as the 33d Photographic Reconnaissance Squadron.  it deployed to the European Theater of Operations, where it conducted combat reconnaissance missions, earning a Distinguished Unit Citation and being cited in the Belgian Army Order of the Day on two occasions.  It remained in Europe following V-E Day, becoming non operational in August 1945.  Its ground echelon returned to the United States in the fall of 1945 and it was inactivated at the port of embarkation.

The squadron was redesignated the 24th Air Intelligence Squadron and activated in Panama in 1992.  It provided intelligence support until it was inactivated in 1995 as the United States withdrew its forces from Panama.  The squadron was reactivated in its current role in 2002.

Mission

The 24th Intelligence Squadron plans, directs and conducts multi-source intelligence, surveillance and reconnaissance (ISR) tasking, processing, exploitation and dissemination operations in support of United States Air Forces Europe, United States European Command, United States Africa Command, United States Central Command, NATO, and joint and combined force air component commanders.  The squadron operates two primary mission systems:  Distributed Common Ground System (DGS-4) and Eagle Vision One.

DGS-4 is a part of the Distributed Common Ground System, which is the Air Force's AN/GSQ-272 "Sentinel" weapon system.  DGS-4 is one of five core sites executing collection, processing, exploitation and dissemination of intelligence data derived from Air Force ISR platforms including Lockheed U-2 and General Atomics MQ-1 Predator unmanned aerial vehicles.  DGS-4 is the only DGS involved in operations across three different commands on a recurring basis.

Eagle Vision One executes collection, processing, exploitation and dissemination of commercial satellite imagery. The 24th Intelligence Squadron's Eagle Vision One is one of five Eagle Vision systems worldwide.  It is the only active duty Eagle Vision unit with its own pool of Eagle Vision imagery analysts.  Eagle Vision is a deployable ground station with the capability to produce CSI and geospatial products.

History

World War II reconnaissance
The squadron was first activated at Army Air Base, Wilmington in late February 1942 as the 24th Observation Squadron, one of the three original squadrons of the 76th Observation Group.  The squadron trained with various single engine and twin engine aircraft in aerial reconnaissance and ground support missions and supported the training of Army ground units through May 1943.  Starting in May 1943, the squadron assisted in Second Army maneuvers.

In August 1943, the squadron mission was changed from visual to photographic reconnaissance and it was redesignated the 33d Photographic Reconnaissance Squadron and relieved from the 76th Group.  in April 1944, the squadron deployed to the European Theater of Operations.

At its first combat station, RAF Chalgrove, the squadron equipped with long-range Lockheed F-5 Lightnings.  The squadron engaged in tactical reconnaissance over the Normandy Beaches of France prior to the Allied invasion on D-Day, 6 June 1944. Afterwards engaged in highly dangerous unarmed reconnaissance of Northern France, the Low Countries and Germany as Allied armies moved west during the Northern France Campaign during the balance of 1944 and the Allied Invasion of Western Germany, spring 1945. Provided battlefield intelligence primarily to the United States Third Army, however also flew reconnaissance missions for the United States First and Ninth Armies as requested.

Assigned to the United States Air Forces in Europe after the V-E Day, was part of the Army of Occupation in Germany before becoming non-operational in August 1945.  The squadron inactivated in October 1945.

Intelligence operations
In 1992, the squadron returned to its original number as the 24th Air Intelligence Squadron and was activated at Howard Air Force Base, Panama to provide intelligence support for Air Force activities in South and Central America.  It continued this mission until inactivating in 1995 as the United States withdrew its forces from Panama.

The squadron reactivated at Ramstein Air Base, Germany on 8 January 2003 as the 24th Intelligence Squadron.

Lineage
 Constituted as the 24th Observation Squadron (Light) on 5 February 1942
 Activated on 6 March 1942
 Redesignated 24th Observation Squadron on 4 July 1942
 Redesignated 24th Reconnaissance Squadron (Bombardment) on 2 April 1943
 Redesignated 33d Photographic Reconnaissance Squadron on 11 August 1943
 Inactivated on 4 October 1945
 Redesignated 24th Air Intelligence Squadron on 1 February 1992
 Activated on 11 February 1992
 Inactivated on 1 December 1995
 Redesignated 24th Intelligence Squadron on 17 December 2002
 Activated on 8 January 2003

Assignments
 76th Observation Group (later 76th Reconnaissance Group), 27 February 1942
 III Reconnaissance Command (later III Tactical Air Command), 11 August 1943
 10th Photographic Group, 1 May 1944
 67th Tactical Reconnaissance Group, 13 June 1944 (attached to 10th Photographic Group until 11 August 1944)
 XXIX Tactical Air Command (Provisional), 7 October 1944 (attached to 67th Tactical Reconnaissance Group until 2 November 1944)
 363d Tactical Reconnaissance Group, 30 October 1944
 67th Tactical Reconnaissance (later 67 Reconnaissance Group), 17 May 1945
 363d Reconnaissance Group, c. 5 July 1945
 Unknown (probably Boston Port of Embarkation), c. 20 August–4 October 1945
 24th Operations Group, 11 February 1992 – 1 December 1995
 United States Air Forces in Europe Air and Space Operations Center, 8 January 2003
 616th Support Group, 1 November 2005
 603d Support Group, 1 December 2006
 693d Intelligence, Surveillance and Reconnaissance Group, 1 April 2008 – present

Stations
 Army Air Base, Wilmington, North Carolina, 27 February 1942
 Pope Field, North Carolina, 28 March 1942
 Vichy Army Air Field, Missouri, 14 December 1942
 Morris Field, North Carolina, 8 May 1943
 Gainesville Army Air Field, Texas, 30 October 1943
 Will Rogers Field, Oklahoma, 16 January–12 April 1944
 Camp Shanks, New York, 14–17 April 1944
 RAF Chalgrove (Sta 465), England, 27 April 1944
 Le Molay Airfield (A-9), France, 15 August 1944
 Toussus le Noble Airfield (A-46), France, 30 August 1944
 Gosselies Airfield (A-87), Belgium, 21 September 1944
 Le Culot Airfield (A-89), Belgium, 5 November 1944
 Venlo Airfield (Y-55), Netherlands, 10 March 1945
 Gutersloh Airfield (Y-99), Germany, 16 April 1945
 Braunschweig Airfield (probably R-37),. Germany, 25 April 1945
 Eschwege Airfield (R-11), Germany, 17 May 1945
 Camp Detroit, France, 23 August 1945 (ground echelon)
 Camp Twenty Grand, France, 15–24 September 1945 (ground echelon)
 Camp Myles Standish, Massachusetts, 3–4 Oct 1945
 Howard Air Force Base, Panama, 11 February 1992 – 1 December 1995
 Ramstein Air Base, Germany, 8 January 2003 – present

aircraft

 Douglas A-20 Havoc, 1942–1944
 North American B-25 Mitchell, 1942–1944
 Douglas DB-7 Boston, 1942–1944
 Piper L-4 Grasshopper, 1942–1944
 Bell P-39 Airacobra, 1942–1944
 Republic P-43 Lancer,  1942–1944
 North American F-6 Mustang, 1942–1944
 Lockheed F-5 Lightning, 1944–1945

Awards and campaigns

References

Notes
 Explanatory notes

 Citations

Bibliography

External links
 http://www.afisr.af.mil/library/factsheets/factsheet.asp?id=11982

024
Reconnaissance squadrons of the United States Air Force